Pope Anastasius III (Latin: Anastasius Tertius; c. 865 - June 913) was the bishop of Rome and ruler of the Papal States from April 911 to his death.

Anastasius was a Roman by birth. A Roman nobleman, Lucian, is sometimes recognized as his father, although other sources assert that he was the illegitimate son of his predecessor, Pope Sergius III.

Almost nothing is recorded of Pope Anastasius III, his pontificate falling in the period when Rome and the papacy were in the power of Theophylact I of Tusculum and Theodora, who approved Anastasius III's candidacy. Under his reign, the Normans of Rollo were evangelized. Anastasius III's papacy faced renewed threats from the Saracens, after they established themselves on the Garigliano river. He was buried in St. Peter's Basilica.

References

External links

 Catholic Encyclopedia: Pope Anastasius III
 Catholic Forum: Pope Anastasius III
Opera Omnia by Migne Patrologia Latina with analytical indexes

Anastasius 03
Anastasius 03
860s births
Anastasius III
Burials at St. Peter's Basilica
10th-century popes